The Beit Jala Lions (Arabic:-لايونز بيت جالا) is a rugby union club situated in the town of Beit Jala near Bethlehem in the West Bank. 

The team was started in October 2007 by international rugby players and local guys and later encouraged by members of the Munster Supporters Club. Their first full match took place in March 2008 against the newly formed Ramallah Blue Snakes, in the town of al-Khader.

In October 2008, the team travelled to Cyprus to take part in the Paphos Tag Rugby Tournament 2008, and play against the Paphos Tigers and Limassol Crusaders. The same month, the team had a tag rugby match against the Ramallah Blue Snakes in the Taybeh Oktober festival.

Plans were being made in 2008 to host a Tag Rugby Tournament in the Palestinian territories, with some teams coming from Ireland.

References

External links
Official website

2007 establishments in the Palestinian territories
Asian rugby union teams
Rugby clubs established in 2007
Rugby union in the State of Palestine
Beit Jala